Supernanny is an American reality television program about parents struggling with aspects of raising their children (e.g. their children's behavior, mealtime, potty training, etc.). The show, featuring professional nanny Jo Frost, is an adaptation of the British series of the same name (also featuring Jo Frost). Frost devotes each episode to helping a family where the parents are struggling with their child-rearing. Through instruction and observation, she shows the parents alternative ways to discipline their children and regain order in their households. Frost is a proponent of the "naughty chair" theory of discipline and is strictly opposed to physical punishment. It aired on ABC from January 17, 2005, to March 18, 2011. A spin-off of the show was produced and was titled America's Supernanny.

On March 27, 2019, it was announced that Supernanny would return for a 20-episode season that premiered on January 1, 2020, on Lifetime with Frost as host again. The first 10 episodes from the season also began airing in the UK on July 20, 2020, on E4. The remaining set of episodes started airing on March 5, 2021.

Format 

The show begins with a short introductory clip of highlights from the episode; after the title segment, Frost is featured riding in a London TXII with the vanity plate "SPRNANNY", where she shows a DVD player with the family's submission video. The submission video introduces the parent(s), children, with their ages, and in some cases other important family members, single parents, as well as the parents' occupations (including if one parent stays at home with the children) and the specific issues the family is facing including clips, concluded by a final call for help alongside a reassuring statement from Frost telling the family she's "on her way".

Frost spends the first day in observation mode, taking mental notes to assess the situation and to devise a plan of action. If a situation is especially serious, she will point out the matter for immediate action. After the first day, she holds the parents' meeting (with clips showing the parents initial reaction), where she praises the family for their beautiful children and then mentions the problems noted. (Earlier episodes had the meeting at the end of the first day; later episodes have it the following day.)

Frost then returns with tools designed to assist the parents in child-rearing. For example, if she determines that the children are misbehaving due to a lack of scheduled activity time with the parents, she will bring in a set schedule, customized for the family's needs. She frequently devises "house rules" for the family. Sometimes the rules are predetermined by Frost, and other times she provides a blank paper and has the family devise them.  Frequent issues on the show involve discipline (as Frost does not endorse spanking as means, she introduces the family to the "naughty chair/step" timeout) and sleep separation.

After a time, Frost leaves the houses to allow the family to implement her actions on their own. The parents' actions are still being filmed, and upon her return Frost calls another parents' meeting to praise them for doing well and/or show them where they went wrong.  She then provides reinforcement as needed.

The ending shows the family saying goodbye to Frost. Later episodes feature the family at a later time showing how well her techniques have worked, along with (after the credits, often featuring a blooper segment) a teaser segment for the next week's episode.

Frost has called in outside assistance on more than one occasion:
One family was dealing with an autistic son; Frost called in a clinical professor with expertise in autism to assist the family in communicating with their son.
Another family (from the Chicago area) had a son showing signs of disrespect and future juvenile delinquency; Frost called in Chicago native and NBA superstar Dwyane Wade to speak with him.
A third family had the father exhibiting classic signs of abuse (especially toward the female members of the family); Frost called in a social worker with expertise in abusive behavior, as well as a woman who was abused by her father and, as a result, made poor decisions in relationships.
In another case, the father was an alcoholic, and Frost located a nearby Alcoholics Anonymous support group for him to attend.
One family had deaf parents who were being taken advantage of by the younger children, who were not deaf; Frost called in an interpreter to help with communication.
One family was dealing with a son who has type 1 diabetes, so Frost compiled a chart of celebrities living with diabetes and called upon a professional snowboarder who is diabetic and runs snowboard camps for children who are diabetic.
One family was dealing with a daughter who had Down syndrome; Frost called in the professor from the segment with the autistic boy to help the girl and enlist the family in speech therapy.
During the latest series Jo took the mother to review her medication with a doctor to support her anxiety.

Home media 
2 DVD releases of Supernanny were released in Region 1 in the USA on 16 May 2006 and another in 2010.

Supernanny: Season One
Supernanny: When little kids cause big headaches

Episodes

References

External links 
 
 

2005 American television series debuts
2011 American television series endings
2020 American television series debuts
2020 American television series endings
2000s American reality television series
2010s American reality television series
2020s American reality television series
American Broadcasting Company original programming
Lifetime (TV network) original programming
American television series revived after cancellation
American television series based on British television series
English-language television shows
Parenting television series
Television series about children
Television series about families
Works about child care occupations